Abdul Hai (fl. late 1500s) was an Armenian who was chief justice (Mir Adl) in the Mughal Empire during the reign of Akbar (1556-1605). He is described in the Tabaqat as an Amir, and in the Ain-i-Akbari (Constitution of Akbar) as "the Qazi of the Imperial Camp".

According to Mesrovb Jacob Seth, his daughter Lady Juliana (died 1598), a doctor in Akbar's seraglio, married Sikandar Mirza.

Their son was Mirza Zulqarnain (c. 1594 – c. 1656) who was an important official within the court of Shah Jahan.

References 

Year of birth missing
Mughal Court
Year of death missing
16th-century judges
16th-century Armenian people
Indian people of Armenian descent